Claudiella ingens is a species of beetle in the family Torridincolidae, the only species in the genus Claudiella.

References

Monotypic beetle genera
Myxophaga genera